The A1214 is a  9.4 mile long 'A' road in the English county of Suffolk. It links Central Ipswich to the A12 and A14 and passes Ipswich Hospital. Its midsection forms an outer ring road around the west and north of Ipswich.

Route
From west to east the road passes through the following settlements:

A12/A14
Ipswich
Ipswich Hospital
Kesgrave
A12

References

Roads in England
Roads in Suffolk